Tschaikowsky's Nutcracker Suite In Dance Tempo is a studio album of phonograph records released by bandleader Freddy Martin, featuring Ray Austin arrangements of Romantic-era Classical composer Pyotr Ilyich Tchaikovsky's suite from the 1892 ballet The Nutcracker.

Reception

Released a month before the 1942-44 recording ban, the album reached number five on the December 29, 1945 Billboard Best-Selling Popular Record Albums chart, the first of its kind. Billboard Magazine offered a half-hearted review:
Freddy Martin goes on a real Tschaikowsky bender for this classical ballet of dance characterizations... While Martin's men turn in a finished performance, most of the suite's charm and spontaneity are lost. It is highly doubtful whether any of the sides can stand up on their own in the music boxes... In any event, the album makes for a pleasant novelty and certainly for pleasant listening for those  not too deeply steeped in the classics.

Track listing
These rearranged titles were featured on a 4-disc, 78 rpm album set, Victor P-124.

Disc 1: (27899)

Disc 2: (27900)

Disc 3: (27901)

Disc 4: (27902)

Reissues
In 1949, RCA Victor reissued the set in the same configuration on four 7" 45rpm records as RCA Victor WP-124. In 1952, the album was reissued again on Extended play 45 rpm as RCA Victor EPB 3052, albeit with two 7" 45rpm records, and two songs per side.

References

The Nutcracker
1942 albums
RCA Victor albums